The information regarding List of rivers in the Bío-Bío Region on this page has been compiled from the data supplied by GeoNames. It includes all features named "Rio", "Canal", "Arroyo", "Estero" and those Feature Code is associated with a stream of water. This list contains 568 water streams.

Content
This list contains:
 Name of the stream, in Spanish Language
 Coordinates are latitude and longitude of the feature in ± decimal degrees, at the mouth of the stream
 Link to a map including the Geonameid (a number which uniquely identifies a Geoname feature)
 Feature Code explained in 
 Other names for the same feature, if any
 Basin countries additional to Chile, if any

List 

 Rio ItataRío Itata3887026STM
  Rio LonquenRío Lonquén3882535STM
  Rio NubleRío Ñuble3878470STM
  Rio ChangaralRío Changaral3895470STM
  Rio ChillanRío Chillán3895084STM* 
  Rio CatoRío Cato3896150STM
  Rio NiblintoRío Niblinto3878693STM
  Rio Los SaucesRío Los Sauces3881355STM
  Rio LarquiRío Larqui3884692STM
  Rio DiguillinRío Diguillín3892432STM
  Rio del RenegadoRío del Renegado3873443STM
  Estero Bureo3897712STM(Estero Bureo, Estero Bustamante)
  Rio AndalienRío Andalién3899674STM(Rio Andalien, Río Andalién)
 Estero Coyanco3893324STM
 Rio Bío-BíoRío Bío-Bío3898379STM(Rio Biobio, Río Biobío)
  Estero Quilacoya3874265STM
 Rio LajaRío Laja3885501STM(Rio Laja, Rio de La Laja, Río Laja, Río de La Laja)
  Rio ClaroRío Claro3894566STM
  Rio RucueRío Rucúe3872723STM
  Rio PolcuraRío Polcura3875526STM
 Rio ReleRío Rele3873516STM
  Rio HuaquiRío Huaqui3887767STM(Rio Guaque, Rio Guaqui, Rio Huaqui, Río Guaque, Río Guaqui, Río Huaqui)
  Rio RarincoRío Rarinco3873687STM
 Tavolevo River
  Rio CulencoRío Culenco3893050STM
 Rio NicodahueRío Nicodahue3878688STM (also Araucania)
 Rio La EsperanzaRío La Esperanza3885996STM (Araucania)
 Estero Maitenrehue3880915STM(Arroyo Maitenrehue, Estero Maitenrehue) (Araucania)
 Rio VergaraRío Vergara3868385STM (Araucania)
 Rio RenaicoRío Renaico3873457STM
  Rio MinincoRío Mininco3879769STM
  Rio MallecoRío Malleco3880840STM(Rio Malleco, Río Malleco) (Araucania)
  Rio HuequenRío Huequén3887625STM(Rio Hueque, Rio Huequen, Río Hueque, Río Huequén) (Araucania)
  Rio RahueRío Rahue3873851STM (Araucania)
  Rio PicoiquenRío Picoiquén3876204STM (Araucania)
  Rio BureoRío Bureo3897711STM
  Rio MulchenRío Mulchén3879199STM
  Rio DuquecoRío Duqueco3892136STM
  Estero LirquenEstero Lirquén3965538STM
 Queuco River
  Rio LonquimayRío Lonquimay3882532STM(Rio Lonquimai, Rio Lonquimay, Río Lonquimai, Río Lonquimay) (Araucania)
 Riachuelo Colcura
 Estero Santa Rosa3871390STM
 Rio LaraqueteRío Laraquete3884821STM
 Estero El Molino3890979STM
 Estero Purgatorio3874603STM
 Estero Los Timones3881332STM
 Estero Lucanay3881228STM
 Estero Las CachanasEstero Las Cachañas3884568STM
 Rio CabreraRío Cabrera3897566STM(Estero Cabrera, Rio Cabrera, Rio Cabrere, Río Cabrera, Río Cabrere)
 Estero Cabrera3897568STM
 Estero Las Chicharras3884480STM
 Estero Cifuentes3894645STM
 Rio PajillasRío Pajillas3877690STM
 Estero PichipehuenEstero Pichipehuén3876232STM
 Rio CoihueRío Coihue3894415STM
 Estero Coihueco3894400STM
 Rio LlayRío Llay3882925STM
 Rio CaicupilRío Caicupil3897426STM(Rio Caicupil, Rio Cayucupil, Río Caicupil, Río Cayucupil)
 Rio VillucuraRío Villucura3868140STM
 Rio TiruaRío Tirúa3869760STM (also Araucania)

  Estero Pullay3874873STM
  Rio BuchupureoRío Buchupureo3897848STM(Estero Buchupureo, Rio Buchupureo, Río Buchupureo)
  Estero La Raya3884816STM
  Rio CobquecuraRío Cobquecura3894524STM
  Rio TaucuRío Taucu3870083STM
  Rio ColmuyaoRío Colmuyao3894163STM
  Estero Guairavo3888576STM(Estero Guairavo, Estero Guarinapo)
  Rio ColomavidaRío Colomávida3894149STM
  Estero Colliguay3894194STM(Estero Colliguay, Estero Colliquai, Estero Colliquay)
  Estero Monte Largo3879441STM
  Estero BuliEstero Bulí3897732STM
  Estero Coiquencillo3894340STM(Estero Coiquencillo, Estero Colquecillo)
  Estero MillauquenEstero Millauquén3879870STM
  Estero Mela3880128STM(Estero Mela, Estero Meta)
  Estero Gaona3889135STM
  Estero Torrecilla3869520STM
  Estero Verguico3868384STM
  Estero San Javier3872151STM
  Estero Rayo3873646STM
  Estero RapuEstero Rapú3873706STM
  Rio Santa RosaRío Santa Rosa3871382STM
  Estero Quilpolemu3874099STM
  Estero Uruque3868764STM
  Estero San Carlos3872319STM(Estero Navotavo, Estero San Carlos)
  Estero NipasEstero Ñipas3878614STM
  Estero Purema3874613STM
  Estero Paniagua3877343STM
  Estero La Merced3885352STM
  Estero Aguita de los LeonesEstero Agüita de los Leones3900365STM(Estero Aguita de los Leones, Estero Agüita de los Leones, Estero Burea, Estero Bureo, Rio de Burea, Río de Burea)(CL)
  Estero Rosario3872815STM
  Estero Changaral3895471STM(Estero Changaral, Estero Coronta)
  Estero Lolco3882671STM
  Estero Molino3879603STM
  Estero Ablemos3900751STM
  Estero Ninhue3878628STM
  Estero Belbun3898520STM
  Estero Canas DulceEstero Cañas Dulce3897013STM
  Estero Cipreses3894615STM(Cipreces, Estero Cipreses)
  Estero TorreonEstero Torreón3869505STM
  Estero Pingueral3875914STM
  Estero Coronta3893520STM(Estero Coronta, Estero Corontas)
  Estero NinquihueEstero Ñinquihue3878621STM(Estero Ninquihue, Estero Niquihue, Estero Ñinquihue)
  Estero Las Piedras3884022STM
  Estero Pangue3877371STM(Estero Pangue, Estero Panque)
  Estero Portezuelo3875395STM
  Rio RafaelRío Rafael3873860STM(Rio Lingueral, Rio Rafael, Río Lingueral, Río Rafael)
  Estero Caudal3896124STM(Estero Caudal, Rio Caudal, Rio Coudal, Río Caudal, Río Coudal)
  Estero Culenar3893060STM
  Estero Pataguas3877023STM(Estero Bulutao, Estero Patagua, Estero Pataguas)(CL)
  Estero CutanEstero Cután3892819STM(Estero Cutan, Estero Cután, Estero Llequen, Estero Llequén)
  Estero Menelhue3880054STM(Estero Menelhue, Estero Menerenhue, Rio Menelhue, Río Menelhue)
  Estero Tragedia3869390STM
  Estero Culenar3893059STM
  Estero Bulileo3897731STM
  Estero Coihueco3894402STM
  Estero Papal3877260STM
  Estero Coliumo3965279STM
  Estero Bullilco3897729STM
  Estero Los Guindos3882025STM(Estero Guindos, Estero Los Guindos, Quebrada Guindos)
  Estero CollenEstero Collén3965287STM
  Estero Cuchacucha3893182STM(Estero Cucha, Estero Cuchacucha)
  Estero Lara3884836STM
  Estero Las Toscas3883848STMA
  Estero Bellavista3898465STM
  Estero Quilmo3874112STM
  Rio ViejoRío Viejo3868256STM
  Estero BoyenEstero Boyén3897981STM
  Estero Las Damas3884395STM(Estero Las Damas, Quebrada Damas)
  Estero Principal3875168STM
  Estero Pincura3875932STM
  Estero del Faro3889576STM
  Estero Las Corrientes3884443STM
  Rio Santa GertrudisRío Santa Gertrudis3871557STM
  Estero Palos Secos3877522STM
  Estero San RamonEstero San Ramón3871731STM(Estero Cayumanque, Estero Cayumanqui, Estero San Ramon, Estero San Ramón)
  Estero Lampato3885267STM
  Estero Gallipavo3889162STM
  Estero del Mogote3879644STM
  Estero Pantanillo3877301STM
  Estero Pichilluanco3876247STM
  Rio GatoRío Gato3889065STM
  Canal El Morro3965333CNLN
  Estero El Salto3890433STM
  Estero Penco3965532STM
  Rio TruchasRío Truchas3869018STM
  Estero de Meco3880243STM
  Estero de los PanosEstero de los Paños3877322STM
  Estero Penco3965349STM
  Estero Rabones3873879STM
  Estero Cotrauco3893356STM(Estero Cotrauco, Estero Guanaco, Estero Guanco, Riachuelo Guauco)
  Estero Maule3880309STM
  Estero ColtonEstero Coltón3893996STM
  Estero Espinal3889821STM(Estero Espinal, Estero Espiral)
  Estero Huemules3887669STM
  Estero Horn3887887STM
  Estero QuillonEstero Quillón3874121STM
  Estero Curapalihue3892885STM(Estero Curapalihue, Estero Dadi)
  Rio MinasRío Minas3879809STM
  Estero San Luis3871942STM
  Estero Tricao3869116STM
  Estero Palpal3877519STM
  Estero Claro3894578STM
  Rio RelbunRío Relbún3873518STM
  Estero Temuco3870010STM(Estero Temuco, Riachuelo de Pemuco, Rio Pemuco)
  Estero Chelle3895279STM
  Estero Las RaicesEstero Las Raíces3883957STM
  Estero Vertena3868377STM
  Estero Danquilco3892737STM
  Estero El Quemado3890627STM(Estero El Quemado, Estero Molino Quemado)
  Estero El Lobo3891148STM
  Estero Rio SecoEstero Río Seco3873103STM
  Estero Pilluco3875976STM
  Rio PalpalRío Palpal3877518STM
  Estero Colicheo3894281STM
  Estero Araucana3899464STM(Estero Araucana, Estero de La Araucana)
  Estero Pemuco3876728STM
  Estero Culenco3893051STM(Estero Culenco, Rio Danicalqui)
  Estero Muqueral3879160STM(Estero Lircay, Estero Muqueral, Estero de Lircai)
  Rio Boca del MauleRío Boca del Maule3898161STM(Rio Boca Maule, Rio Boca del Maule, Río Boca Maule, Río Boca del Maule)
  Estero Tomeco3869652STM
  Estero Nahuelcura3879091STM
  Rio DanicalquiRío Dañicalqui3892744STM
  Estero Manco3880728STM
  Estero Pachagua3877835STM
  Estero El Toro3890256STM
  Estero Ranchillos3873767STM
  Estero Pangal3877395STM
  Estero Guindos3888258STM
  Estero Sauzal3871177STM
  Estero Las Diucas3884388STM
  Estero Perdices3876532STM(Arroyo de las Perdices, Estero Perdices)
  Estero los Peucos3876388STM
  Estero Quinquihueno3874008STM
  Estero las AguilasEstero las Águilas3900375STM
  Estero Las Nieves3884131STM(Estero Las Nieve, Estero Las Nieves)
  Estero Caracoles3896783STM
  Estero Nininco3878626STM
  Estero Pileo3876006STM
  Estero Colliguay3894192STM
  Estero Bermejo3898423STM
  Rio CoihueRío Coihue3894416STM
  Estero Ratones3873671STM
  Estero Monte AguilaEstero Monte Águila3879475STM
  Estero de los Sapos3871271STM
  Estero Blanquillo3898183STM(Arroyo Blanquillo, Estero Blanquillo)
  Estero La Langosta3885495STMI
  Estero Catalinas3896183STM
  Estero Colliguay3894193STM(Estero Colliguai, Estero Colliguay)
  Rio QuinquebuenoRío Quinquebueno3874012STM
  Rio TrilaleoRío Trilaleo3869093STM(Estero Trilaleo, Rio Trilaleo, Río Trilaleo)
  Estero Quemazones3874392STM
  Rio ChancoRío Chanco3895482STM
  Estero Avellanos3899098STM
  Estero Molino3879602STM(Arroyo de Molino, Estero Molino)
  Estero Burriqueces3897694STM(Estero Burriqueces, Estero Burriquetes)
  Estero San JoseEstero San José3872092STM
  Estero Mulas3879211STM
  Estero Panqueco3877318STM
  Estero BarranEstero Barrán3898742STM
  Estero Tapihue3870136STM
  Estero Yumbel3867623STM
  Estero Agua Cascada3900569STM
  Estero Infiernillo3887209STM
  Estero Peruco3876460STM
  Rio RereRío Rere3873411STM
  Estero Trilaleo3869094STM
  Estero Los Palos3881645STM
  Rio ChivilingoRío Chivilingo3894924STM(Rio Chihuilleco, Rio Chivilingo, Río Chivilingo)
  Estero VillagranEstero Villagrán3868181STM(Estero Burriqueces, Estero Villagran, Estero Villagrán)
  Rio ItatitaRío Itatita3887023STM
  Estero NipilcoEstero Ñipilco3878613STM
  Estero Moya3879241STM
  Rio del MolinoRío del Molino3879591STM
  Rio CholguanRío Cholguán3894886STM
  Rio HuepilRío Huépil3887635STM
  Estero HuecoEstero Huecó3887729STM
  Estero Lajitas3885556STM
  Estero Atravesado3899163STM
  Estero Raquecura3873705STM
  Rio GrandeRío Grande3888779STM
  Estero Copinco3893645STM
  Estero Chillancito3895081STM
  Estero Turra3868864STM
  Estero Colchagua3894313STM
  Estero Llico3882896STMI
  Estero San CristobalEstero San Cristóbal3872301STM
  Rio RenicoRío Reñico3873436STM
  Rio GomeroRío Gomero3888938STM
  Estero San CristobalEstero San Cristóbal3872300STM
  Estero Llahuilo3883041STM(Estero Llahuilo, Estero Llambilo)
  Estero CuramavidaEstero Curamávida3892901STM
  Estero Polvareda3875481STM
  Estero Tricauco3869108STM
  Estero Buenuraqui3897793STM
  Estero Chilcoco3895124STM
  Estero La Potreada3884930STM
  Rio CarampangueRío Carampangue3896766STM
  Rio TubulRío Tubul3868990STM
  Estero Luanco3881232STM
  Rio RaquiRío Raqui3873698STM
  Estero Llollinco3882846STM
  Estero Ortiz3877970STM
  Estero Las Perras3884031STM
  Estero Pichiluanco3876243STM
  Estero Catalina3896191STM
  Estero Catalina3896190STM
  Estero Agua Pie3900452STM(Arroyo Agua Pie, Arroyo Agua Pié, Estero Agua Pie)
  Estero RinicoEstero Riñico3873164STM
  Rio de CaliboroRío de Caliboro3897278STM(Estero Cariboro, Rio Calri, Rio de Caliboro, Río de Caliboro)
  Estero Tricao3869115STM
  Estero Los Rucos3881382STM
  Estero Agua FriaEstero Agua Fría3900481STM
  Rio MachoRío Macho3881088STM
  Estero DesagueEstero Desagüe3892637STM
  Estero Trehuaco3869249STM
  Estero La Vieja3883539STM
  Rio LiaRío Lía3883288STM(Rio Elias, Rio Lia, Río Elias, Río Lía)
  Estero Blanco3898241STM
  Rio ConumoRío Conumo3893689STM(Rio Conumo, Rio Conumu, Río Conumo, Río Conumu)
  Rio PichiloRío Pichilo3876245STM
  Estero Las Chilcas3884472STM
  Estero Los Caracoles3882274STM
  Estero Quiques3873960STM
  Estero Pichitropen3876218STMI
  Estero Paso Hondo3877091STM
  Estero Centinela3895968STM
  Estero Colico3894276STM
  Rio PitraleoRío Pitraleo3875753STM
  Estero El Indio3891238STM
  Estero CaripilunEstero Caripilún3896655STM
  Rio los PatosRío los Patos3876978STM
  Estero Nahuel3879099STM
  Estero Malloga3880824STM(Estero Malloga, Estero Moyoga)
  Estero Chacay3895755STM
  Estero Menural3880040STM
  Rio ChancoRío Chanco3895481STM
  Rio AlborradaRío Alborrada3900260STM(Estero Alborrada, Rio Alborrada, Río Alborrada)
  Estero Pichipolcura3876226STM
  Rio QuillaylebuRío Quillaylebu3874144STM
  Estero El Toro3890255STM
  Estero El Manco3891103STM
  Estero Huitanco3887475STM
  Estero Morera3879339STM
  Estero Centinela3895967STM
  Estero Sirena Grande3870822STM
  Estero CuranaduEstero Curañadú3892897STM(Arroyo Curanadu, Arroyo Curanadú ,Estero Curanadu, Estero Curañadú, Rio Curanadu, Rio Curañadú)
  Estero Los Cipreses3882196STM
  Rio BulelcoRío Bulelco3897734STM
  Estero Macal3881124STM
  Rio El MolinoRío El Molino3890969STM(Estero El Molino, Rio El Molino, Río El Molino)
  Arroyo PatahuecoArroyo Patahuecó3877018STM
  Estero del Arco3899417STM
  Estero Chacay3895754STM(Arroyo Chacai, Estero Chacay)
  Estero Malalcura3880876STM
  Estero Chuchuico3894785STM
  Rio PaillacahueRío Paillacahue3877746STMI
  Estero Chillico3895074STM
  Rio ColoradoRío Colorado3894029STM
  Estero Polcura3875532STM
  Estero Claro3894577STM
  Estero San JeronimoEstero San Jerónimo3872144STM
  Estero Loncopan3882576STM
  Estero de los ColiguesEstero de los Coligües3894257STM
  Estero Los SotanosEstero Los Sótanos3881351STM
  Estero El Espigado3891385STM
  Estero Paso Ancho3877102STM
  Rio QuidicoRío Quidico3874288STMI
  Estero Los Huinganes3881996STM(Estero Huinganes, Estero Los Huinganes)
  Estero Los Canelos3882283STM
  Rio TrubunleoRío Trubunleo3869021STM
  Estero El Toro3890254STM
  Estero Las Heras3884331STM
  Estero Los Borrachos3882334STM
  Estero Humenco3887450STM
  Estero Agua FriaEstero Agua Fría3900480STM
  Estero DesagueEstero Desagüe3892636STM
  Estero Las Quemas3883975STM
  Estero Villuco3868144STM
  Estero Quilque3874092STM
  Estero Las AnimasEstero Las Ánimas3884642STM
  Estero Cullileo3893034STM(Arroyo Collileo, Estero Cullileo, Rio Collileo, Río Collileo)
  Estero Lipelipe3883119STM
  Estero Mundo Nuevo3879183STM
  Estero Colico3894275STM
  Estero Diuto3892382STM(Estero Diuto, Estero Duilo, Estero Duito, Rio Diuto, Río Diuto)
  Estero Los Radales3881435STM
  Estero Los Chuchos3882203STM
  Estero Arinco3899354STM
  Estero Los Notros3881679STM
  Estero Elgueta3891288STM
  Estero Las Rosas3883923STM
  Rio HuillincoRío Huillinco3887528STM(Estero Huillinco, Rio Huillinco, Río Huillinco)
  Rio QuiapoRío Quiapo3874303STM(Rio Quiapo, Río Quiapo)
  Estero Locobe3882724STM(Arroyo Locobe, Estero Locobe)
  Estero La Chupalla3886251STM(Estero Chupalla, Estero La Chupalla)
  Estero Anguillas3899594STM
  Canal del Laja3885571DTCH
  Estero EcheverriaEstero Echeverría3892082STM
  Estero del VolcanEstero del Volcán3867970STM
  Estero Ramadillas3873805STM
  Rio TaboleoRío Taboleo3870372STM
  Estero El BolsonEstero El Bolsón3891854STM
  Estero Maipo3880986STM
  Estero AnimasEstero Ánimas3899577STM(Estero Animas, Estero Ánimas, Rio Animas, Río Animas)
  Estero Plegarias3875629STM
  Estero CanileoEstero Cañileo3896907STM
  Rio RanasRío Ranas3873776STM
  Estero Petronquines3876400STM(Estero Petronpuines, Estero Petronquines)(CL)
  Rio del PinoRío del Pino3875909STM
  Estero Paso Hondo3877090STM(Estero Paso Honda, Estero Paso Hondo)
  Estero Pichicoreo3876283STM
  Estero Pantanillos3877295STM
  Rio NegroRío Negro3878784STM
  Rio DescabezadoRío Descabezado3892626STM
  Estero Coihue3894420STM
  Estero RiopardoEstero Ríopardo3873110STM
  Estero Cantarrana3896880STM
  Estero Caillihue3897416STM
  Estero Las Aguadas3884672STM
  Estero Coihueco3894401STM
  Estero Paillihue3877741STM
  Estero Panqueco3877317STM
  Estero Guallaco3888546STM
  Estero Quilaco3874271STM
  Rio MaipoRío Maipo3880982STM(Estero Maipo, Rio Maipo, Río Maipo)
  Estero Coyanco3893323STM
  Estero CanicuraEstero Cañicura3896910STM
  Estero Pichicollahue3876287STM
  Estero Potrero de las Yeguas3875283STM
  Estero Mampil3880775STM(Estero Mampil, Estero Manpil)
  Estero Los Padres3881665STM
  Rio RanquilRío Ránquil3873738STM
  Estero Campamento3897125STM
  Estero Rocacura3872993STM(El Rocacura, Estero Rocacura)
  Estero El Rodado3890527STM
  Estero Quilleco3874140STM
  Estero Nancagua3879059STM
  Estero La Castellana3886310STM
  Estero Correntoso3893461STM
  Estero LipinEstero Lipín3883114STM
  Estero Agua Grande3900468STM
  Estero Cholguahue3894888STM(Estero Cholguahue, Estero Cholhuahue)
  Estero de Choroico3894855STM(Arroyo Choroico, Estero de Choroico)
  Estero de Trapa Trapa3869295STM
  Estero El Boqui3891846STM
  Estero El Valiente3890197STM
  Estero Bataco3898614STM
  Estero Paulin3876961STM
  Estero Renegado3873444STM
  Estero Dimilhue3892428STM
  Estero Pichicholguahue3876297STM
  Rio TrongolRío Trongol3869043STM
  Rio NahueRío Nahue3879101STM
  Rio ChirihuillinRío Chirihuillin3894971STM
  Estero Nieves3878667STM
  Rio CoreoRío Coreo3893565STM(Estero Coreo, Rio Coreo, Río Coreo)
  Estero Los Pinos3881546STM
  Estero Llenquereo3882916STM
  Rio AillinRío Aillín3900344STM
  Rio CuranilahueRío Curanilahue3892889STM
  Estero Bulleco3897730STM(Estero Bolaca, Estero Bolleco, Estero Bulleco)
  Estero ArilahuenEstero Arilahuén3899355STM
  Estero Curiche3892871STM
  Estero Primera Agua3875176STM
  Arroyo Quirquincho3873947STM
  Estero Pozuelos3875215STM
  Estero Calabozo3897364STM(Arroyo Calabazo, Estero Calabozo)
  Estero Pemuco3876727STM
  Rio LebuRío Lebu3883455STM(Rio Cupano, Rio Cupanu, Rio Cupaño, Rio Lebu, Río Cupañu, Río Lebu)
 Riachuelo Quilañanco
 Riachuelo Curihuillín
  Estero Curanilahue3892891STM(Estero Curanilahue, Estero Curanilhue, Rio Curanilahue, Río Curanilahue)
 Rio PilpilcoRío Pilpilco3875954STM
  Estero CuricoEstero Curicó3892869STM
  Estero Pelehue3876781STM
  Estero MenirEstero Meñir3880051STM
  Rio FortunaRío Fortuna3889381STM
  Estero LinecoEstero Liñeco3883141STM
  Estero CanicuraEstero Cañicura3896909STM
  Estero de Malven3880792STM
  Estero Chumulco3894725STM
  Estero Junquillos3886689STM
  Estero Ullinco3868835STM
  Estero Los Laureles3881964STM
  Estero Calbuco3897332STM(Estero Calbuco)
  Estero Licura3883255STM
  Estero Pile3876010STM
  Estero Cullinco3893028STM
  Estero Las Diucas3884387STM
  Estero LirquenEstero Lirquén3883091STM
  Estero LirquenEstero Lirquén3883092STM
  Rio Cura MallinRío Cura Mallín3892905STM(Estero Infiernillo, Rio Cura Mallin, Rio Curi Maullin, Río Cura Mallín, Río Curi Maullín)(CL)
  Rio PichicaramavidaRío Pichicaramávida3876302STM
  Estero Chimpel3895051STM
  Estero Micauquen3879937STM(Estero Micauquen, Estero Nicauquen)
  Estero Raquilca3873697STM
  Estero Quilapalo3874240STM
  Estero NancoEstero Ñanco3879056STM
  Rio CuracoRío Curaco3892917STM(Estero Curaco, Rio Curaco, Río Curaco)
  Rio QuilmoRío Quilmo3874110STM
  Estero Triunquilemu3869069STM
  Rio PilunchayaRío Pilunchaya3875947STM
  Estero CatriboliEstero Catribolí3896143STM
  Rio ManquecuelRío Manquecuel3880687STM(Estero Manquecuel, Rio Manquecuel, Río Manquecuel)
  Estero RenacaEstero Reñaca3873463STM
  Estero Nihuinco3878657STM
  Estero Chupalla3894702STM
  Estero PuelonEstero Puelón3875029STM
  Estero NiremetunEstero Niremetún3878602STM
  Rio MinincoRío Mininco3879768STM(Estero Mininco, Rio Huequecura, Rio Mininco, Río Huequecura, Río Mininco)(CL)
  Estero Mondungo3879516STM
  Estero CanicuEstero Cañicú3896912STM
  Estero Cachidivoill3897518STM
  Estero Pichillenquehue3876250STM
  Estero Agua Blanca3900585STM
  Estero Quinahue3874056STM
  Estero Azul3899035STM
  Estero RehuenEstero Rehuén3873537STM
  Estero Monte Loma3879439STM
  Estero PilquenEstero Pilquén3875950STM
  Estero Pitril Norte3875750STM
  Estero Quimpo3874070STM
  Estero Rucacalquin3872749STM
  Rio TueRío Tué3868972STM(Estero Otue, Estero Otué, Rio Tue, Río Tué)
  Estero Coihueco3894399STM
  Estero Ruca Raqui3872732STM
  Estero Quillehua3874138STM
  Rio PichibureoRío Pichibureo3876305STM
  Estero Copahue3893672STM
  Estero Coihueco3894398STM
  Estero Coihuequito3894384STM
  Estero Indio3887257STM
  Estero LicauquenEstero Licauquén3883259STM
  Estero Los Alerces3882457STM
  Estero CallinEstero Callín3897231STM
  Estero La MaquinaEstero La Máquina3885393STM
  Rio CuracoRío Curaco3892916STM
  Estero Saltuco3872490STM
  Estero Agua Blanca3900584STM
  Estero Lirque3883094STM(Estero Lirque, Lingue)
  Rio QuencoRío Quenco3874380STM
  Estero Pitril Sur3875749STM
  Estero Ranquilco3873734STM
  Estero Epun3890019STM
  Estero Vilotregua3868136STM
  Estero Boquiamargo3898051STM(Estero Boquiamarga, Estero Boquiamargo)
  Estero Pangue3877370STM
  Estero Hilotregua3888003STM
  Estero Quillaileo3874176STM
  Rio PangueRío Pangue3877364STM
  Estero Tromen3869056STM
  Rio PichimulchenRío Pichimulchén3876238STM
  Estero Lirgueno3883098STM
  Estero San Pedro3871807STM
  Rio LlancaoRío Llancao3882987STM(Estero Llancao, Rio Llancao, Río Llancao)
  Estero Ranquilmo3873729STM
  Estero Barros3898664STM
  Rio PinaresRío Pinares3875942STM
  Rio Tres VientosRío Tres Vientos3869129STM
  Estero La MaquinaEstero La Máquina3885392STM
  Estero Teguanieque3870049STM
  Rio ButacoRío Butaco3897669STM
  Rio LladenRío Lladen3883049STM
  Rio RerihuireRío Rerihuire3873408STM
  Rio PaicaviRío Paicaví3877777STM(Rio Paicavi, Rio Paicovi, Río Paicaví, Río Paicovi)
  Rio PelecoRío Peleco3876784STM
  Rio LeivaRío Leiva3883426STM
  Estero Repute3873420STM Reputo?
  Rio CayucupilRío Cayucupil3896065STM(Estero Conhueco, Riachuelo de Conhueco, Rio Cayucupil, Río Cayucupil)
  Estero CabreriaEstero Cabrería3897561STM(Arroyo Cabreria, Arroyo Cabrería, Estero Cabreria, Estero Cabrería, Rio Butamalal, Río Butamalal)
  Rio TucapelRío Tucapel3868982STM
 Estero Henteli
  Rio CaramavidaRío Caramávida3896769STM(Rio Caramavida, Rio Curamavida, Rio Curamávida, Rio Grande, Río Caramávida, Río Grande)
Puyehue River
Lanalhue Lake (X!)
Elicura River
Calebu River
  Rio AgrioRío Agrio3900625STM
  Rio ColiqueoRío Coliqueo3894232STM(Rio Colicheo, Rio Coliqueo, Río Colicheo, Río Coliqueo)
  Rio DiabloRío Diablo3892509STM(Rio Diablo, Rio El Diablo, Río Diablo, Río El Diablo)
  Estero Aguas Blancas3900437STM
  Rio PocunoRío Pocuno3875561STM
  Rio TrananahueRío Trananahue3869345STM
  Rio DiablitoRío Diablito3892538STM(Rio Diablito, Rio El Diablito, Río Diablito, Río El Diablito)
  Rio HuiraRío Huira3887484STM
  Rio QuipucaRío Quipuca3873964STM
  Rio PincaRío Pinca3875940STM
  Rio LleulleuRío Lleulleu3882908STM (also Araucania)
  Estero Huilmo3887518STM(Estero Huilmo, Estero Machihue)
  Estero Coihueco3894397STM
  Estero Negro3878812STM(Estero Negro, Rio Negro, Río Negro)
  Estero Pidelco3876180STM
  Rio GrandeRío Grande3888778STM
  Estero Junquillo3886692STM
  Estero Chacras Buenas3895712STM
  Quebrada Melinchique3880109STM(Quebrada Melinchique, Rio Melinchique, Río Melinchique)
  Rio HuillincoRío Huillinco3887527STM(Rio Huillinco, Rio Lluillinco, Río Huillinco, Río Lluillinco)
  Estero Licauquen3883258STM(Estero Licauquen, Rio Licauquen, Río Licauquen)
  Estero PilmaiquenEstero Pilmaiquén3875966STM
  Estero Chanquin3895452STM(Estero Chanquin, Rio Chanquin, Río Chanquin)
  Estero Racui3873870STM
  Estero Auquinco3899123STM(Estero Auquinco, Quebrada Bella Vista)
  Estero Limenmahuida3883192STM(Estero Limenmahuida, Quebrada Negra)
  Estero Cristales3893292STM(Estero Cristales, Rio Cuchillahue, Río Cuchillahue)
  Estero Tranaquepe3869343STM
  Estero Mahuilque3881010STM(Estero Mahuilque, Estero Manuilque, Rio Mahuilque, Río Mahuilque)
  Estero Medihueco3880222STM
  Rio QuidicoRío Quidico3874289STM
  Rio GrandeRío Grande3888777STM(Quebrada Honda, Rio Grande, Río Grande)
  Estero Colcuma3894302STM
  Estero Huillinco3887535STM(Estero Huillinco, Rio Huillinco, Río Huillinco)
  Estero Matranquil3880328STM(Estero Macranqui, Estero Matranquil, Rio Matraquin, Río Matraquin)
  Estero Quilquilci3874083STM
  Rio CuyelRío Cuyel3892790STM
  Estero Molino3879601STM
  Rio QuillaicahueRío Quillaicahue3874183STM
  Rio MallaRío Malla3880854STM
  Rio HuenencuraRío Huenencura3887657STM(Rio Huencura, Rio Huenencura, Río Huencura, Río Huenencura)
  Rio LoncotripaiRío Loncotripai3882571STM
  Estero Los Maquis3881795STM
  Estero Boquerihue3898062STM(Estero Boquerihue, Estero Boquerino)
  Estero Guapi3888392STM
  Estero Poduco3875554STM

See also
 List of lakes in Chile
 List of volcanoes in Chile
 List of islands of Chile
 List of fjords, channels, sounds and straits of Chile
 List of lighthouses in Chile

Notes

References

External links
 Rivers of Chile
 Base de Datos Hidrográfica de Chile
 

Landforms of Biobío Region
Bio Bio